The 2012 Formula Nippon Championship was the fortieth season of the premier Japanese open-wheel motor racing series. The series for Formula Nippon racing cars was contested over seven rounds with a non-championship final round at Fuji Speedway as part of the JAF Grand Prix. The two-time Le Mans winner André Lotterer was the defending champion.

This was also the final season run under the name Formula Nippon, the series would be renamed into Japanese Championship Super Formula, a name selected by public, in 2013.

Teams and drivers

Note:All drivers (except Yuhki Nakayama) also participated the non-Championship JAF Grand Prix.

Race calendar and results

 All races will be held in Japan. A non-championship round, entitled JAF Grand Prix Super GT and Formula Nippon Sprint Cup 2012, will be held at the conclusion of the season.

Championship standings

Drivers' Championship
Scoring system

Teams' Championship

References

External links
2012 Japanese Championship Formula Nippon

Formula Nippon
Super Formula
Nippon